Louisiana Highway 73 (LA 73) is a state highway in Louisiana stretching from Geismar to Baton Rouge. LA 73 was built as a bypass to the backbends of River Road. It was soon after bypassed itself in a more complete way with U.S. Route 61 (Airline Highway).

Route description
From LA 75 (River Road), LA 73 travels north north east as an undivided two-lane road through the Dutchtown area before hitting I-10 and US 61.  From US 61 it turns north through Prairieville, Louisiana and turns northwest to cross Bayou Manchac.  At one time, this portion of the highway was called Hope Villa Road.  For most of its length in East Baton Rouge Parish, LA 73 is known as Jefferson Highway.  At Tiger Bend Road it becomes a four-lane with turning lane for about a mile and before becoming concurrent with Airline Highway for another mile.  After leaving Airline Highway it takes a generally northwesterly path until it becomes Government Street at the entrance to downtown Baton Rouge.  As Government Street it proceeds due west to a junction with River Road. LA 73 ends at an intersection with the southbound beginning of LA 30, also known as St. Philip Street.

History
The route of LA 73 was originally called "Clay Cut Road," as it roughly followed the Claycut Bayou through the southern part of East Baton Rouge Parish.  Other names for the road were Hope Villa Road, as it traversed through the community of Hope Villa in Ascension Parish.  When the Jefferson Highway auto trail was designated in 1916, Clay Cut and Hope Villa Roads became part of the new road (there is now another Claycut Road in Baton Rouge, located south of the present-day LA-73).  When Louisiana numbered their highways in 1921 plan, Jefferson Highway was designated Louisiana Highway 1.  US 61 followed the section between Prairieville and the Mississippi River from 1926 until 1933 when the Airline Highway was opened between Prairieville and the Bonnet Carré Spillway.  US 61 remained on the section between Prairieville and Baton Rouge until 1941, when Airline Highway was extended into Baton Rouge. As of 2018, the portion west of LA 948 is under agreement to be removed from the state highway system and transferred to local control.

Major junctions

References

0073
Transportation in Ascension Parish, Louisiana
Transportation in East Baton Rouge Parish, Louisiana
Transportation in Baton Rouge, Louisiana